Major General Athar Abbas is a former Director General of the ISPR and former Ambassador of Pakistan to Ukraine from 2015 to 2018.  He retired from active military service after 35 years in June 2012.

Military career
General Abbas was commissioned in October 1976 in the 54th PMA Long Course from the Pakistan Military Academy, Kakul into the Pakistan Armoured Corps. He has held various command, staff and instructional appointments that include command of an armoured regiment, armoured brigade and armoured division. He has been General Staff officer (Operations) in various armoured formations. He is a graduate of Command and Staff College, Quetta and Malaysian Armed Forces Staff College, Malaysia. After 35 years of active military service, Athar Abbas retired in June 2012.

Education
He is a participant of the Executive Course at Asia Pacific Centre for Security Studies, Hawaii, US. He has attended Armed Forces War Course and National Defence Course at the National Defence University, Islamabad. He has been on the faculty of Command and Staff College, Quetta and National Defence College, Islamabad. He holds a master's degrees in War Studies as well as Strategic Studies from Quaid-i-Azam University, Islamabad. He was promoted to Major General in June 2005 and had commanded an armoured division in Kharian from June 2005 to June 2007.

Other office appointments
Before joining Inter Services Public Relations Directorate, General Abbas was serving as Director General Quartering and Lands in Quartermaster General's Branch, General Headquarters. After he was appointed as the DG ISPR, Major General Mohammad Farooq replaced him at his previous position.

Family
Athar Abbas is married with three children, two daughters and a son. 

He also has 4 brothers, 3 of them are journalists Azhar Abbas (journalist), Mazhar Abbas, and Zaffar Abbas. The other is Anwer Abbas.

See also
ISPR
Pakistan Army
Pakistani Armed Forces

References

External links
 ISPR Official Website

|-
 

1955 births
Living people
Pakistani generals
Directors-General of the Inter-Services Public Relations
Ambassadors of Pakistan to Ukraine
Recipients of Hilal-i-Imtiaz